Off the Beaten Path is the third studio album by saxophone player Dave Koz. It was released by Capitol Records on August 20, 1996. Koz himself provides vocals on "That's the Way I Feel About You."

Track listing

Personnel 
 Dave Koz – alto saxophone (1, 2, 5, 7, 9), baritone saxophone (2), tenor saxophone (2, 10, 13), soprano saxophone (4, 6, 8, 11, 12, 13), vocals (9), acoustic piano (13)
 Jim Cox – Hammond B3 organ (1, 2, 5, 8), Wurlitzer electric piano (2, 11)
 Brian Mann – accordion (1, 4-7)
 Jamie Muhoberac – keyboards (2, 4)
 Chester Thompson – Hammond B3 organ (3, 12)
 Jeff Koz – acoustic guitar (1, 4, 5, 7, 9, 10, 12), classical guitar (1, 4), lead guitar (4)
 Gregg Arreguin – electric guitar (1, 4, 5, 7-12), acoustic guitar (2, 3), lead guitar (12)
 Tim Pierce – electric guitar (1, 2, 3, 5, 10, 11, 12), mandolin (1, 5), slide guitar (3), baritone guitar (4), classical guitar (4, 8), 12-string guitar (5), dobro (7), acoustic guitar (8, 9, 11)
 Greg Leisz – lap steel guitar (2, 11), lead guitar (10)
 Leo Kottke – acoustic guitar (6)
 David Piltch – electric bass (1, 2, 5, 11), bass (3), acoustic bass (8, 10), bass percussion (10)
 John Pierce – electric bass (4, 7, 9, 12)
 Mark Schulman – drums (1, 2, 3, 5, 8, 10, 11)
 Kenny Aronoff – drums (4, 7, 9)
 Lenny Castro – percussion (1, 2, 3, 8, 10), djembe (1)
 Brian Kilgore – snare drum (5), bass drum (5), chimes (5), maracas (7), vibraphone (8), percussion (11), congas (12), tambourine (12), washboard (12)
 Gary Herbig – baritone saxophone (3), tenor saxophone (3)
 Nick Lane – trombone (3)
 Greg Adams – trumpet (3), horn arrangements (3)
 Chuck Findley – trumpet (3)
 Phil Ayling – tin whistle (5)
 Sid Page – fiddle (5)
 Larry Corbett – cello (6)
 Tollak Ollestad – harmonica (12)
 Sharon Celani – backing vocals (4)
 Stevie Nicks – backing vocals (4)
 Sweet Pea Atkinson – backing vocals (10, 12)
 Sir Harry Bowens – backing vocals (10, 12)
 Jim Gilstrap – backing vocals (10, 12)
 Arnold McCuller – backing vocals (10, 12)
 Kipp Lennon – backing vocals (11)
 Mark Lennon – backing vocals (11)

Production 
 Bruce Lundvall – executive producer 
 Dave Koz – producer, arrangements 
 Jeff Koz – producer, arrangements
 Thom Panunzio – producer, mixing, recording (1-12)
 Bob Salcedo – recording (13), assistant engineer 
 John Aguto – assistant engineer 
 Howard Willing – assistant engineer 
 Steve Hall – mastering 
 Valerie Pack – production coordinator 
 Shelly Haber – A&R
 Leanne Meyers – A&R 
 Tommy Steele – art direction, design 
 Lisa Peardon – photography 
 Vision Management – management company 

Enhanced CD credits
 Lou Beach – producer, graphic design 
 Richard D'Andrea – producer, graphic design, programming 
 Chris Silagyi – producer, graphic design, engineer 

Studios
 Recorded at Groove Masters (Santa Monica, California); A&M Studios (Hollywood, California); House of Blues Studio (Encino, California).
 Mixed at Groove Masters
 Mastered at Future Disc (Hollywood, California).

Charts

References

See also
Larry Carlton

Dave Koz albums
1996 albums
Capitol Records albums
Instrumental albums